Stenorhopalus rugosa is a species of beetle in the family Cerambycidae. It was described by Fairmaire & Germain in 1861.

References

Beetles described in 1861
Necydalinae